Lapping is a machining process in which two surfaces are rubbed together with an abrasive between them.

Lapping may also refer to:

Lapping (magic), a set of techniques in conjuring
Lapping (motorsport), the act of passing someone who is one circuit behind
Lapping, the licking movement of an animal's tongue, usually for drinking
Lapping fraud or teeming and lading, an accounting scheme